Ancita fuscicornis is a species of beetle in the family Cerambycidae. It was first described by Ernst Friedrich Germar in 1848 as Acanthoderes fuscicornis. It is known from Australia.

References

Ancita
Beetles described in 1848